The Caterpillar C13 is an inline-6 diesel internal combustion engine made by Caterpillar. The engine is 12.5 liters in displacement (763 cubic inches). The cylinder size is 5.12 × 6.18 bore/stroke.
Engine ratings were available from 380–525 horsepower at 2100 RPM. The peak torque occurs at an engine speed of 1200 RPM.

The engine weighs over one ton at 2610 pounds. The Cat C13 is often used in Class 8 vehicles (tractor-trailers). The Gleaner A85 is a Gleaner combine harvester that uses the C13, and it is considered a class 8 vehicle. In the A85 as well as in fire trucks, it is rated at a higher horsepower.

Sample applications 

 Caterpillar 345C L excavator
 Caterpillar 730 articulated dump truck and chassis
 Caterpillar 730 EJ articulated dump truck
 Caterpillar 735 articulated dump truck and chassis
 Freightliner Century Class truck
 Gleaner A85 combine harvester
 Harimau tank
 Sisu E13TP military truck

See also

 Caterpillar C27

References

Diesel engines by model
Caterpillar Inc.
Straight-six engines